The 2011 Pan American Games were held in Guadalajara, Mexico from October 14 to October 30, 2011. A total of about 6,000 athletes representing 42 National Olympic Committees participated in these Games. Overall, 361 events in 36 disciplines were contested; 188 events were open to men, 160 to women and 13 were in mixed competition. Two disciplines were open only to men: baseball and rugby sevens, while softball and Synchronized swimming were the sports in which only women were allowed to compete. Racquetball and basque pelota returned to the Pan American Games after missing the last edition of the Games and rugby sevens made its debut. New events in fencing, karate, squash, track cycling and water skiing made their debut at the Games.
{| id="toc" class="toc" summary="Contents"
|-
| colspan="3" style="text-align:center;"|Contents
|-
|
Archery
Athletics
Badminton
Baseball
Basketball
Basque pelota
Beach volleyball
Bowling
Boxing
Canoeing
Cycling
Diving
Equestrian
Fencing
|valign=top|
Field hockey
Football
Gymnastics
Handball
Judo
Karate
Modern pentathlon
Racquetball
Roller skating
Rowing
Rugby sevens
Sailing
Shooting
Softball
|valign=top|
Squash
Swimming
Synchronized swimming
Table tennis
Taekwondo
Tennis
Triathlon
Volleyball
Water polo
Water skiing
Weightlifting
Wrestling
|-
| style="text-align:center;" colspan="3"| Medal winner changes       Statistics       References
|}


Archery

Athletics

Badminton

Baseball

Basketball

Basque pelota

Beach volleyball

Bowling

Boxing

Canoeing

Cycling

Road

Track

Mountain biking

BMX

Diving

Equestrian

Fencing

Field hockey

Football

Gymnastics

Artistic

Rhythmic

Trampoline

Handball

Judo

Karate

Modern pentathlon

Racquetball

Roller skating

Rowing

Rugby sevens

Sailing

Shooting

Softball

Squash

Swimming

Synchronized swimming

Table tennis

Taekwondo

Tennis

Triathlon

Volleyball

Water polo

Water skiing

Weightlifting

Wrestling

Freestyle

Greco-Roman

Medal winner changes
A. Venezuelan athlete Víctor Castillo had tested positive for the banned substance methylhexaneamine and was stripped of his gold medal he won in the men's long jump event. After Castillo was disqualified, the gold medal went to Daniel Pineda of Chile, the silver medal went to David Registe of Dominica, and the bronze medal to Jeremy Hicks of United States.

B. Canadian wakeboarder Aaron Rathy had tested positive for the banned substance methylhexaneamine and was stripped of his silver medal he won in the men's wakeboard event. After Rathy was disqualified, the silver medal went to Marcelo Giardi of Brazil, and the bronze medal to Alejo de Palma of Argentina.

Statistics

Medal leaders
Athletes that won at least three gold medals or at least four total medals will be listed below.

References

Medalists
2011
Medalists at the 2011 Pan American Games